is a Japanese anime based on the PlayStation 2 games Shining Tears and Shining Wind. Shining Tears X Wind presents an adapted version of Shining Winds story, seen from the perspective of the character Souma. It is directed by Hiroshi Watanabe and produced by Studio Deen. The series started airing in Japan on April 6, 2007 and finished airing on June 29, 2007. The anime has the same opening and ending themes as the game Shining Tears. A sequel to this is a mobile game entitled Shining Wind X, which was released in January 2008.

Storyline
A group of students from St. Luminous College are investigating the mysterious disappearances that are happening all around Tatsumi Town. One student, who was researching a book entitled 'End Earth', which describes an alternate world, also mysteriously disappears. As Mao, a being from the other world, enters their world in order to look for her friend, Zero, she teams up with Souma and Kureha in order to battle a monster who also came to their world. Just when things seem to go their way, an accident teleports Souma and Kureha into another world. To make things more complicated, Zero appears to the two stating that he will now entrust the world to Souma. As they travel this new world, they encounter familiar friends and enemies, and they begin to realize that getting back to their own world is harder than they previously thought.

In End Earth, a war, surrounding a legendary item called "The Holy Grail", begins. Zero later tells Souma that the world will end if Zeroboros, the guardian of time and space, awakens. This guardian will use whoever wins the war as a body.

Characters

Real World (Elde)

An athletic student who, along with Kureha, was transported to the dream continent, End Earth. At the beginning of the series, Souma has feelings for Kureha, despite knowing that she has feelings for Kiriya; he sometimes gets annoyed at Kiriya for not noticing her feelings for him. He then confesses his affection for her, which apparently is not mutual, shortly before being transported to the other world. After seeing Kureha presumably die, he was able to pull out a legendary sword from Kureha's body. Souma turns out to be a 'Soul Blader', which is a person that can form a sword from the heart of any person he shares similar emotions with. Unlike Kureha, Souma would rather stay in End Earth, as he believes that it is the right place for him and since he thinks that he could be "together" with Kureha in End Earth. Later, after Souma and Kureha meet up with Kiriya and Seena, he departs from the group, leaving Kiriya and Seena to take care of Kureha, realizing that she did not feel the same way about him and thus decided to no longer use Kureha's heart as a Soul Blade, since he knew that her heart had feelings for Kiriya. So, he temporarily uses a katana when there are no Soul Blades around for him to use.
When Souma and Kureha were between dimensions, they were greeted by Zero, who entrusted Souma in guarding the world from then on.
After his second meeting with Zero, he receives one of the Twin Dragon Rings, and begins to see the world in a whole new way. His attitude also shifts from a rash and emotional state, to having a calm and understanding demeanor. Souma becomes a sort of mediator, not taking any sides, and travels with Lazarus, Ryuna, Elwyn, and Blanc Neige, in his mission to protect and save the world. After expressing his desire to join Weissritter, he is nominated as its proxy leader. In the end, after seeing Mao's sad and tearful face, he realizes his true feelings for Mao and her feelings for him.  Souma then decides to give up his chance of going back to his own world and decides to stay with Mao and Weissritter.
Out of the rest of the characters, Souma was able to extract the most Soul Blades; having drawn blades from Kureha, Hiruda, Kiriya, who in fact possesses his Holy Grail, and also from all the members of the current Weissritter.

A student who also happens to work at a shrine as a miko, or shinto priestess. Kureha is skilled in the art of archery, or kyūdō. She was transported to End Earth with Souma after they helped Mao defeat a monster. Upon their arrival, she was attacked by monsters and presumably died. After Kiriya and Souma's fight, she joins Kiriya and the other Luminous Knights.
Kureha has feeling for Kiriya, but she never expresses them to him. In the end, she returns to her own world, together with Kiriya and Seena.

A quiet and shy student who receives a message from an elven woman from End Earth. When he tells his friends, the group dismisses the message as they believe it to only be a dream. Kiriya is a skilled swordsman; ranging from kendo to fencing. It is said that no one could beat him if he was to fight seriously. The cherry blossom of their college transports him and Seena to End Earth right after Souma and Kureha, taking the entire building as well. He becomes the knight for an independent mercenary group called the 'Luminous Knights', which is started by Seena.
Like Souma, Kiriya is also a Soul Blader, who uses Seena's "heart" as a sword. Kiriya is completely oblivious to Kureha's and Seena's feelings for him, the latter being one of his childhood friends. He later forms a close bond with an elf named Xecty, who is later revealed to be an artificial recreation of the Elven Queen. Until Xecty's death, he was confident in his mission to have Saionji admit defeat. Since the start of the war, his attitude shifted from his shy and quiet self, to a rash and emotional state, who sees that fighting is the only way to win (the complete opposite to Souma's change of behavior).
He is later revealed to hold Souma's Holy Grail, Souma's . The one who holds his Holy Grail is Xecty.
In the end, he chooses to return to his own world, together with Kureha and Seena.

A student who belongs to the Student Council just like the other characters. She, along with Kiriya, are later transported to End Earth shortly after Kureha and Souma. Upon their arrival, Seena and Kiriya form an independent mercenary group called the Luminous Knights; with Seena as the leader.
Seena is also very skilled in fencing.
In the end, she returns to her own world, together with Kiriya and Kureha.

An heir to a rich family and Student Council President. He, along with Hiruda, are transported to End Earth before the other main characters. When he first encounters his old friends in End Earth, he is revealed to be an enemy. He became the Emperor of Baelgard, and goes by the name "Traihard".
Like Souma and Kiriya, he is also a Soul Blader, and chooses to draw swords from Baelgard's four guardians, which includes Reia Hiruda. Seeing Soul Bladers as "chosen ones", he offers Kiriya and Souma to join him in his crusade. Saionji plans to conquer all of End Earth, under the pretense that he is actually "saving" it from darkness. His plans, however, are thwarted by Killrain's release of dark energy. After Hiruda reverts to her normal self, Hiruda attempts to rescue Saionji when he is linked to the dark tower, with his life in danger. It is then that Saionji realizes her true feelings for him, and in return, he seems to develop feelings for her also, resulting in him being able to draw his Holy Grail from her heart.
In the end, he decides to stay in End Earth, together with Hiruda, Xecty, and Jin-Crow in Baelgard, to restore the forest back to its former glory.
Saionji is an extremely talented swordsman; he was capable of defeating Kiriya in a duel with normal swords.

A seemingly innocent and quiet girl, who is devoted to Saionji. She found the book that allows herself and Saionji to be brought into End Earth. Though she wants to follow him, she does not want to be engulfed in darkness, so she develops a dark second personality, one that will do all the things that she does not want to. She becomes one of Baelgard's four guardians, the Hellfire Alchemist, Hildareia. Her alter ego prefers the darkside, and even betrays Saionji by siding with Killrain after he takes over the dark elven army. She often does experiments on many elves, turning them into mindless soldiers for Baelgard. Her dark soul blade is called . Destroying the evil personality's soul blade is the only way to bring back the original Reia Hiruda.
The good personality contains Saionji's Holy Grail, Saionji's , which was instrumental in defeating Er Fahren. She decides to stay in End Earth, together with Saionji, Xecty, and Jin-Crow in Baelgard, to restore the forest back to its former glory.

End Earth

Valeria Country

Mercenary Knighthood Weissritter

Zero is Xion, or what is left of his soul. His angelic wings represent the two entities inside his body, the black one resembles Zeroboros, the white one resembles what is left of Xion, but for all causes, Xion no longer exists. It seems he went to Elde to find someone able to replace him as the Guardian of End Earth. He later chooses Souma, and after meeting him between worlds, states that he now 'entrusts' the world to him. He was shown to have still possessed the Twin Dragon Rings, but gave Souma one of the rings, telling him to use it to see the true world.
He keeps running from Mao, as some time before, he unwillingly killed Ryuna (she impaled herself upon his sword) in order to destroy Zeroboros, who lived inside her, but instead it possessed him, making him sprout black wings form his back. During that altercation he also killed Lazarus. It was Mao's calling that made him fight Zeroboros' possession, turning one of the black wings white, thus leaving a piece of Xion's soul. He later accepted himself as no longer a human, and revived Ryuna and Lazarus using the capsules in the Sea Dragon King Ruins.
He decides to leave the group and is currently watching the world, entrusting Souma with protecting the world in his place.

A quarter-beast; she has a pair of cat-like ears. She is also the Princess of Bestia. She traveled to Souma's world looking for Zero. In the process, she accidentally sent Souma and Kureha into her world. She previously saw Xion standing next to the dead bodies of Lazarus and Ryuna. Since Xion flew away before telling her that he has been possessed by Zeroboros, she was left there confused and in shock. This prompted her search for Zero, whom her country of Bestia had placed on the wanted list for murdering a priestess: Ryuna. Though she explains that this makes it easier for her to find him. She is also the true leader of Weissritter. Her particular soul blade becomes Souma's preferred soul blade. She falls in love with Souma and her feelings for him are revealed when she cries when he wants to leave, which moves him and he decides to stay with her in End Earth.

A priestess of Etwarl Shrine who believes in Souma. Zeroboros lived inside her, so in order to stop him, she committed suicide by throwing herself into Xion's sword. She was later resurrected by Zero, along with Lazarus. Souma is able to pull a broadsword type soul blade from her called ; it has the power to paralyze its enemies with a blinding light.

Note: Though Japanese versions translated the name as Razalus, the official English translation became Lazarus.A Dragonian tribesman, who swore to protect Souma. He is also a friend to Ryuna, who acknowledged Zero's intentions. He was killed by Xion when he got possessed by Zeroboros, but was later resurrected by Zero, along with Ryuna. Souma is able to draw an enormous single-bladed sword from him called .Note: Though Japanese versions translated the name as Elwing, the official English translation became Elwyn'.
An old friend of Zero from the Elf race, and is also the princess of Fontina. Elwyn is now traveling with Souma, and had mentioned that she would kill Zero if he abuses his powers.

An old friend of Zero and an Ice Sorceress, who lives in an ice house and showers with ice. She is also the princess of Runevale.

For unexplained reasons, the remaining members of Weisritter (Dr. Pios, Volg, Cupido and Keiner) do not appear in the anime nor is any mention made of them by their former allies.

Liberia Country

Holy Kingdom Philias

Princess and Priestess of Philias' Tower of the Sun.

Prince of Philias, thus the future king, and Clalaclan's younger brother. He was victim of a curse by Shumari, which made him very sick, but was later healed by Houmei. In the last episode, he becomes the king of Philias.

Priest of Seiran.

United Trading Nation Seiran

The King of Seiran. Before becoming king, he was the captain of a pirate crew, but his great conviction and good heart made him win the trust of the beastmen. In the last episode, he becomes a captain again, leaving the throne to Hyouun. In the game, he joins Weissritter.

Chancellor of Seiran who had the appearance of a nine-tailed fox. He was responsible for the assassination of Astraea's queen and of the curse bestowed upon Caris. He is later killed by Baelgard's moving fortress 'Eisen Sarg', right before he was to kill Souma.

One of Seiran's five generals. A tiger-like warrior, who is a good friend of Hyouun. He is very proud of his skills as a warrior.

One of Seiran's five generals. A quiet centaurian warrior. He acts as King Rouen's scout.

One of Seiran's five generals. A bird-like warrior.

One of Seiran's five generals. A bow-wielding turtle-like warrior. When sober, he is very understanding, however, when he is drunk, he fights others for no apparent reason.

One of Seiran's five generals. He was ordered to watch over Houmei. He is unofficially considered part of the Luminous Knights due to his involvement with Houmei who is revealed to be his older sister. He has fallen in love with human girls, particularly Kureha and Seena, but he has to keep these feelings to himself due to Houmei's intervention. In the last episode, he becomes the king of Seiran.

 
The Priestess of Seiran's Tower of Rain Water. Centuries ago, she tried to destroy the world. Due to that, she was imprisoned in the forbidden lands of Konron. She later joined the 'Luminous Knights' as their tactician. Despite her appearance, she is actually 3000 years old.

In the game, she is actually of the same dragon race as Hyoun although doesn't look like it. An event in the game explains this connection. In the anime, she is referred to as an elf.

Demonic Alchemy Empire Baelgard (Former Elven Kingdom Astraea)

One of Baelgard's four guardians, who is an artificial life-form made by Hiruda, using an ancient weapon as base. She is in fact Killrain's sister, Celestia, as Hiruda made her body as Xecty using Celestia's cells, but then she ended up getting infected by the darkness and Hiruda created a dark matter to absorb the forces of darkness, preventing her from further infection.
During a duel with Kiriya, an earthquake causes the two to fall into a cavern. Kiriya talks with Xecty and tells her the importance of hope and believing in your self, forming a close bond with her. Later, during the fight between Kiriya and Saionji, she gets in the middle and is stabbed by Saionji, sacrificing her life in order to stop the war. She explains to him that she did it in order to give hope to the world, and that Kiriya is her hope. Her spirit then joins the wind, as a way to protect both. She is later revived by one of the pods from the Sea Dragon King Ruins, and joins the Luminous Knights. She also becomes the priestess of Astraea's Tower of the Wind. Her soul blade is called . She also contains Kiriya's Holy Grail, being drawn from her Kiriya's .
She decides to stay together with Saionji, Hiruda, and Jin-Crow in Baelgard, to restore the forest back to its former glory.

One of Baelgard's four guardians. Also an immortal due to a contract with his demon sword. He is in fact Philias' late prince, Leon, now under the control of his demon sword. His soul blade is called , and the sword and armor are similar to the ones used by Leon. He was later defeated by Souma, resulting in Leon's spirit becoming free from the demon sword's control.

One of Baelgard's four guardians. Originally a normal and kind elf, until he was infected by the darkness. Though he is the brother of Astraea's queen, Celestia, he kept Xecty from knowing her true origins. He's shown to possess immense dark energy, as shown after Xecty's death, when he released said energy as a powerful blast, which covered nearly all of Liberia in an icy blizzard. His anger prompted him to blame all living souls, and after controlling the dark elven army of Baelgard, he plans to destroy everything. Only after Souma, Kiriya, and Saionji use the combined powers of their Holy Grails, that his soul is liberated. Together with his sister Celestia, he decides to stay behind and be sealed in the other dimension.
His soul blade is called , a giant sword able to shoot laser beams. Unlike the others, Killrain himself transforms into a giant sword, rather than having the sword drawn from within him.

Others

A mysterious birdman. Jin-Crow is a friend to Killrain, before the latter was infected by dark energy. He can still be seen at Killrain's side, but he also searches for a way to help his friend overcome the darkness. He gives Kiriya the location of the ancient weapons, and later escorts Kiriya's group to Bestia. In the past, he, Killrain, and Leon, Clalaclan's older brother, swore peace to the countries, but then Shumari's plot ruined their plans. He decides to become Xecty's protector. Together with Saionji, Hiruda, and Xecty, they are busy restoring the forest back to its former glory.

She is a mysterious elven girl who spoke to Kiriya through dreams. She is later revealed to be the spirit of Celestia, the elven queen of Astraea, whose cells were used to create Xecty. With her help, Xecty becomes the priestess of Astraea's Tower of the Wind. She decides to be with her brother, the soul of the liberated Killrain, and they are sealed together in the other dimension.

A strange little fellow who guided Souma and Elwyn through an icy blizzard. He guided the group to Celestia through a secret opening in the forest to the north of Philias. There, he is revealed to be the Spirit King of the Wind. He has an affinity towards elves who can strangely understand him. After Celestia, he joins Xecty in Baelgard, to restore the forest to its former glory.

Soul Blades
 Here's a list of all known Soul Blades, from the game Shining Wind and the anime.

Souma
Kureha: 
Ryuna: 
Elwyn: 
Blanc Neige: 
Lazarus: 
Mao: 
Kiriya:

Kiriya
Seena: 
Kureha: 
Clalaclan: 
Caris: 
Houmei: 
Hyoun: 
Rouen: 
Jin-Crow: 
Xecty: 
Xecty (End Section):

Traihard
Xecty: 
Hildareia: 
Zeed: 
Killrain: 
Hiruda Reia:

Episode list

Music
Opening theme
"Shining Tears"
Lyrics by: Natsuko Kondo
Composition and arrangement by: Gou Takahashi
Song by: Souichiro Hoshi

Ending theme

Lyrics by: Yurie Kokubu
Composition and arrangement by: Masaki Iwamoto
Song by: Souichiro Hoshi

Staff
Original Work: Sega
Director: Hiroshi Watanabe
Series Composition: Hiro Masaki
Screenplay: Hiro Masaki
Music: Kei Haneoka
Original Concept: Tsuyoshi Sawada
Original Character Design: Tony Taka
Character Design: Mariko Emori, Yukiko Ban
Art Director: Michiyo Miki
Director of Photography: Shinya Kondou
Producer: Masahiro Nakayama
Animation Producer: Masahiro Toyosumi
Color Setting: Shinji Matsumoto
Editing: Masahiro Matsumura
Music Director: Fumiko Harada
Planning: Tsuyoshi Sawada
Sound Director: Ayako Misawa
Animation Company: Studio Deen

External links

Adventure anime and manga
Anime television series based on video games
Fantasy anime and manga
Shining (series)
Studio Deen
Discotek Media